John Keith Davies (born 1955) is a British astronomer.

Discovery
Davies was born in Liverpool, England. Whilst at Leicester University, he discovered the source of the Geminid meteors, the asteroid called 3200 Phaethon.

OPTICON project
In 2001 he began as  Project Scientist for the OPTICON project, an organisation with the goal of integrating all of European astronomers.

References

Publications 
"Astronomy from Space" (Wiley-Praxis Series in Astronomy & Astrophysics), publication date 1997, Wiley-Blackwell, hardcover, 346 pages, illustrated

"Cosmic Impact", publication date 1986-09-01, St. Martin's Press, hardcover, 192 pages, illustrated.

1955 births
Living people
20th-century British astronomers
21st-century British astronomers